Collodi is a part of the municipality of Pescia in the Tuscany region of central Italy.

It is a medieval village documented since the 12th century. It is known for its link to Carlo Lorenzini, who used the pen name Carlo Collodi and wrote The Adventures of Pinocchio. The writer, who was born in Florence and lived most of his life there, spent part of his childhood in the village and adopted its name for his literary career.

The village has an ancient fortress and the aristocratic Villa Garzoni, which has a major garden. The economy of the village is based on tourism, thanks largely to a park dedicated to Pinocchio.

Image gallery

Park of Pinocchio

Others

Monuments and interesting places 
 Church of San Bartolomeo
Park of Pinocchio
Villa Garzoni

References

External links
 http://www.collodi.com/
 http://www.meteocollodi.it
 Stazione Meteo Collodi - Ponte all'Abate
 Carlo Collodi a Collodi Percorso turistico sulla vita di Carlo Lorenzini a Collodi

Populated places in Tuscany
Pistoia